David Makes Man is an American coming-of-age drama television series that premiered on August 14, 2019, on OWN. In December 2019, OWN renewed the series for a second season which premiered on June 22, 2021.

Premise
David Makes Man follows a 14-year-old named David "from the projects who is haunted by the death of his friend and relied on by his hardworking mother to find a way out of poverty."

Cast and characters

Main
 Akili McDowell as David
Kwame Patterson as Adult David (season 2)
 Alana Arenas as Gloria, David's and JG's mother
 Phylicia Rashad as Dr. Woods-Trap
 Nathaniel Logan McIntyre as Seren
 Kyle Beltran as Adult Seren (recurring season 2)
 Isaiah Johnson as Sky
 Ade Chike Torbert as Raynan
 Jordan Bolger as Shinobi
 Cayden K. Williams as JG (Jonathan Greg), David's younger brother and Gloria's younger son
 Arlen Escarpeta as Adult JG (season 2)
 Travis Coles as Mx. Elijah
 Daniel Augustin as Eman
 Gillian Williams as Jessica Kelly
 Ruben Santiago-Hudson as Dr. Bree
 Elvis Nolasco as Tio-Teo
 Randy Gonzalez as Mr. Lopez
 Lela Rochon as Alma
 Trace Lysette as Femi
 Liza Colón-Zayas as Principal Fallow
 Juanita Jennings as Mrs. Hertrude
 Lindsey Blackwell as Marissa
 Erica Luttrell as Adult Marissa (season 2)
 Solomon Valdez as Willie Derrick
 Teshi Thomas as Tare
 Aba Arthur as Adult Tare (season 2)
 Nick Creegan as Desmond
 Kimaya Naomi as Shella
 Zsané Jhé as Adult Shella (season 2)
 Logan Rozos as Star Child
 Tony Plana as Joe Padilla (season 2)
 Brittany S. Hall as Nicole (season 2)
 Bobbi Baker as Robin (season 2)
 Patrice Arenas as Denise (season 2)
 Trinity Cidel as Trenise (season 2)
 Brandi Huzzie as Trisha (season 2)
 Rodney Gardiner as Corey Roberts (season 2)
 Janmarco Santiago as Elan (season 2)

Episodes

Series overview

Season 1 (2019)

Season 2 (2021)

Production

Development
On August 16, 2017, it was reported that Oprah Winfrey Network had given the production a straight-to-series order created by Tarell Alvin McCraney.
On June 26, 2018, it was announced that Dee Harris-Lawrence will be the showrunner and set to serve as an executive producer along with Tarell Alvin McCraney, Mike Kelley, Melissa Loy, Michael B. Jordan, and Oprah Winfrey. Production companies involved with the series were slated to include Warner Horizon Scripted Television, Page Fright, and Outlier Productions. The series was set to premiere on August 14, 2019. The pilot episode was premiered at South by Southwest on March 10, 2019. On December 19, 2019, OWN renewed the series for a second season. On June 29, 2020, HBO Max acquired the streaming rights for the series which was debuted on July 16, 2020. The series' producer Dee Harris-Lawrence most recently signed an overall deal with Warner Bros. Television Studios. The second season premiered on June 22, 2021.

Casting
In June 2018, it was announced that Akili McDowell, Phylicia Rashad, Nathaniel Logan McIntyre, Isaiah Johnson, Ade Chike Torbert, Jordan Bolger, Cayden K. Williams, and Travis Coles are cast as series regulars. In August 2018, Alana Arenas has been cast as a series regular while Gillian Williams, Ruben Santiago-Hudson, Elvis Nolasco, and Randy Gonzalez are cast in recurring roles. On October 25, 2018, Lela Rochon, Trace Lysette, Liza Colón-Zayas, Juanita Jennings, Lindsey Blackwell, Solomon Valdez, Teshi Thomas, and newcomers Nick Creegan, Kimaya Naomi and Logan Rozos have joined the series in recurring roles. On August 6, 2020, Kwame Patterson and Arlen Escarpeta were cast in starring roles for the second season. On December 8, 2020, Tony Plana, Brittany S. Hall, Erica Luttrell, Zsané Jhé, Bobbi Baker, Patrice Arenas, Trinity Cidel, Brandi Huzzie, Rodney Gardiner, and Janmarco Santiago joined the cast in recurring roles for the second season.

Filming
Production began in the summer of 2018 in Orlando, Florida.

Reception

Critical response 
On review aggregator Rotten Tomatoes, the series holds an approval rating of 100% based on 23 reviews, with an average rating of 8.98/10. The website's critical consensus reads, "Powerful, beautiful, and like nothing else on TV, David Makes Man blends dreamy aesthetics with an empathetically crafted story to create a truly unique viewing experience." On Metacritic, it has a weighted average score of 81 out of 100, based on 11 critics, indicating "universal acclaim".

Accolades

References

External links

2010s American drama television series
2019 American television series debuts
English-language television shows
Oprah Winfrey Network original programming
Poverty in television
Serial drama television series
Television series about teenagers
Television series by Warner Bros. Television Studios
Television series by Warner Horizon Television
Television shows set in Florida